Alex Wood may refer to:

 Alex Wood (baseball) (born 1991), American baseball pitcher
 Alex Wood (politician) (born 1950), former Labour leader of Edinburgh City Council in Scotland
 Alex Wood (ice hockey) (1909–1979), ice hockey goaltender
 Alex Wood (American football) (born 1955), American football coach
 Alex Wood (bishop) (1871–1937), Anglican bishop in India

See also 
 Alexander Wood (disambiguation)
 Alex Woods (disambiguation)